New York's 33rd State Assembly district is one of the 150 districts in the New York State Assembly. It has been represented by Clyde Vanel since 2017.

Geography
District 33 is located in Queens, comprising the neighborhoods of Cambria Heights, St. Albans, Hollis, Queens Village, Bellerose and parts of Floral Park.

Recent election results

2022

2020

2018

2016

2014
}}

2012

2010

References

33